Elaine 'Lenny' Holohan is a camogie player, winner of All-Ireland Senior medals in 2007, in 2010 and 2011.

Other awards
National Camogie League medals in 2009, 2010 and 2011; Leinster Championship 1995, 1996, 1999, 2000, 2008, 2010, 2011; Winner of All-Ireland Senior club medal in 1995; three Leinster Senior Club 1995, 1996, 2000; Club Senior 1995, 1996, 1999, 2000, 2008 (player of the match); three Senior 'B' Club 2002 (captain), 2005, 2006; Leinster Under-14 1994; Leinster Under-16 1996; Leinster Under-18 1997, 1998; Leinster Senior 1999, 2000 (captain), 2001, 2003, 2004, 2007; played for Rest of Ireland against All-Ireland champions Tipperary in 2001; Leinster Senior Colleges with Coláiste Bríde 1996, 1998, 1999; Purple and Gold Star 2008.

Family background
Her twin sister Bernie played Intermediate for Wexford winning an All Ireland medal in 2011. The twins' father, Barney, was a selector on the All-Ireland 'B' winning Wexford Under-16 team in 2010.
She is married to the Duffrey Donkey.

References

External links
 Camogie.ie Official Camogie Association Website
 Wexford Wexford camogie site

1985 births
Living people
Irish twins
Twin sportspeople
Wexford camogie players